Taylor Demonbreun (born October 21, 1994) is an American world traveler and motivational speaker who holds the Guinness World Record for the fastest time to visit every sovereign country in the world. Demonbreun set this record on December 7, 2018, after traveling for one year and 189 days, having started on June 1, 2017. She was 24 years old when she achieved the record. She previously held the record as the youngest person to travel to all the world's countries. 

Demonbreun is from Tuscaloosa, Alabama, United States.

References

Living people
People from Tuscaloosa, Alabama
Guinness World Records
1994 births